Conal Cunning (born 1998) is an Irish hurler who plays for Antrim Senior Championship club Dunloy and at inter-county level with the Antrim senior hurling team. He usually lines out as a wing-forward.

Career

A member of the Dunloy club, Cunning first came to prominence with the club's senior team that won County Championship titles in 2017 and 2019. He made his first appearance on the inter-county scene as a member of the Antrim minor team that won consecutive Ulster Minor Championship titles in 2015 and 2016 before later playing for the under-21 team. Cunning joined the Antrim senior hurling team in 2018 and has since won a Joe McDonagh Cup title.

Honours

Dunloy
Ulster Senior Club Hurling Championship: 2022
Antrim Senior Hurling Championship: 2017, 2019, 2020, 2022

Antrim
Joe McDonagh Cup: 2020
Ulster Minor Hurling Championship: 2015, 2016

References

External links
Conal Cunning profile at the Antrim GAA website

1998 births
Living people
Dunloy hurlers
Antrim inter-county hurlers